0P (zero P) or 0-P may refer to:
-polytope, a geometric form; see Zero-dimensional space
0-point energy or zero-point energy, the lowest possible energy that a quantum mechanical physical system may have
0-point field, or the vacuum state in quantum field theory
0 passer rating, an American football statistic; see List of NFL quarterbacks who have posted a passer rating of zero
0 polynomial, a type of polynomial
0 page, or zero page, the series of memory addresses at the absolute beginning of a computer's address space

See also
P0 (disambiguation)
OP (disambiguation)